MS Star Pisces was a cruise ship owned by Star Cruises and did short cruises from Hong Kong. She was originally built as the cruiseferry MS Kalypso in 1990 at Masa-Yards Turku New Shipyard, Finland for Rederi AB Slite for use in Viking Line traffic. The ship was designed by Per Dockson. Star Pisces had a sister ship, Pearl Seaways.

History

Viking Line
The late 1980s were a time of hectic new building in Baltic Sea ferry services. Between 1985 and 1991 no less than 11 new ships debuted for competing companies Viking Line and Silja Line. During construction of the Kalypso in 1989 the shipbuilding company Wärtsilä Marine was declared bankrupt. A new company, Masa-Yards, was established to continue operating Wärtsilä's shipyards in Turku and Helsinki. As a result of the bankruptcy the Kalypsos final price was much greater than originally agreed.

When delivered on April 30, 1990, the Kalypso entered traffic on the route connecting Turku to Mariehamn and Stockholm, where she sailed without mishap for the next three years. 1993 was to be the year when Slite would take delivery of another newbuild, the largest ferry in the world, M/S Europa. However, the Swedish krona was devaluated shortly before Slite were supposed to take delivery of the new ship. The Europa ended up in rival Silja Line's fleet in March 1993, and in April Rederi AB Slite was declared bankrupt.

As a result of Slite's bankruptcy, Kalypso and her sister were sold at an auction in August 1993. Bids were made by SF Line (the remaining Viking Line operator), P&O Ferries and DFDS, but the final buyer emerged from Malaysia where the newly established Star Cruises bought both ships. The Kalypso, the last ship ever delivered to Rederi AB Slite, stayed in Viking Line's traffic until January 1994.

Star Cruises
After the end of her service for Viking Line, the Kalypso sailed to Naantali, Finland where she was docked and renamed MS Star Pisces. Later in the same month she sailed to Finnyards, Rauma, Finland, where she was rebuilt as a cruise ship. In April 1994 the ship began operating cruises from Singapore. Originally the ship sported a dark blue hull with a narrow red band on top, which was later changed into all-white, matching the livery of other Star Cruises' ships. She was later moved to making day and night cruises from Hong Kong. In May 2009 the ship suspended her sailings from Hong Kong and was laid up initially at Hong Kong, later moved to Port Klang for further lay up.

In February 2010, she was reactivated for cruising out of Penang.

She finished her deployment in Penang by the end of December 2010 and was refurbished in Singapore in January 2011. Star Pisces also received hull art, being the first ship to feature hull art in the Star Cruises fleet. She returned to Hong Kong to offer daily high sea cruises in late February 2011.

Star Pisces entered drydock for major renovation in February 2013.

In April 2022, it was announced that Star Pisces along with SuperStar Aquarius and SuperStar Gemini were all sold for scrap, following the collapse of Star Cruises' parent company, Genting Hong Kong. The Star Pisces was sold to a scrapyard in Alang, India. She was beached in 12 July 2022 under the name Pisc.

References

External links

 M/S Kalypso on Fakta om Fartyg 
 Star Pisces on Star Cruises

Ships built in Turku
Ships of Star Cruises
1989 ships
Articles containing video clips